The Mississippi Symphony Orchestra, from 1944 to 1989 the Jackson Symphony Orchestra, is the oldest Symphony Orchestra in the State of Mississippi.

References

Musical groups from Mississippi
Musical groups established in 1944
American orchestras